Usha Thakkar (born 1 October 1935) is an Indian politician. She was elected to the Lok Sabha, the lower house of the Parliament of India from Kutch in Gujarat as a member of the Indian National Congress.

References

External links
Official biographical sketch in Parliament of India website

Indian National Congress politicians from Gujarat
Women members of the Lok Sabha
India MPs 1984–1989
Lok Sabha members from Gujarat
1935 births
Living people